Gostun is a village located in the municipality of Prijepolje, Serbia. As of 2011 census, the village has a population of 64 inhabitants. During the Second World War a detachment of Muslim militia was established in this village, under command of Selim Juković.

References

Populated places in Zlatibor District